The Four Points by Sheraton San Jose Downtown or Hotel Montgomery is a historic hotel in Downtown San Jose, California.

History
The total cost of the renovation, including the move, was $25.5 million.

The move is considered to be the 4th heaviest building ever moved.
The hotel was reopened in 2004 as the Hotel Montgomery, but later rebranded to Four Points by Sheraton,  now doing business as Four Points by Sheraton San Jose Downtown.  The hotel is owned and operated by Khanna Enterprises,  III,  LLC,  of Santa Ana, CA.

The building is listed on the California Register of Historical Places.

In 2016, the hotel announced plans to expand by means of construction of a 24-story addition, directly north of the original building.

References

External links

Hotels in San Jose
Hotel buildings on the National Register of Historic Places in California
Sheraton hotels
Buildings and structures in San Jose, California
Hotel buildings completed in 1911
National Register of Historic Places in Santa Clara County, California
1911 establishments in California